Alton Club, also known as the Jerry J. Presley Conservation Education Center, is a historic summer camp and national historic district located in the Current River State Park near Eminence, Shannon County, Missouri.  The district encompasses 14 contributing buildings, 3 contributing sites, and 6 contributing structures associated with a summer retreat for the employees and customers of the Alton Box Board Company.  It developed between about 1937 and 1945 and include the Main Lodge (c. 1938, c. 1985), Classroom / Pool Hall (c. 1940), Lower Dorm (c. 1940), Gymnasium (c. 1940), Barbeque House (c. 1940), Lake House (c. 1940), Manager's Residence (c. 1945), and Entrance Columns (c. 1940).

It was listed on the National Register of Historic Places in 2005.

References

Historic districts on the National Register of Historic Places in Missouri
Event venues on the National Register of Historic Places in Missouri
Buildings and structures in Shannon County, Missouri
National Register of Historic Places in Shannon County, Missouri
National Park Service rustic in Missouri